Gornja Sipulja is a village in the municipality of Loznica, Serbia. As of the 2002 census, the village's population was 250 people.

References

Populated places in Mačva District